Andrew James Kaser (born February 11, 1993) is a former American football punter. He played college football at Texas A&M.

College career
In Kaser's first season with the Texas A&M Aggies, he played in only one game, punting twice. Kaser was then redshirted the next year and returned to the field the following year.

As a redshirt sophomore in 2013, Kaser was a finalist for the Ray Guy Award, given annually to the best collegiate punter. Kaser was also named 2013 Sporting News All-American and first-team All-SEC punter. He led the SEC with an average punt at 47.4 yards, breaking the old school record of 47.0 yards held by Shane Lechler. Kaser kicked his longest punt of the season for 76 yards against Rice University. Kaser would later be named special teams MVP at the Aggies annual banquet.

In 2014, his junior year, Kaser was ranked No. 11 in the nation and No. 3 in the SEC, averaging 44.5 yards a punt on 56 punts, with 15 punts over 50 yards. Kaser also earned National Punter of the Week after averaging 54.7 yards on three punts in A&M's victory over Auburn. Kaser had a career-high four punts downed inside the opponent 20-yard line against Mississippi State and Louisiana-Monroe.

Professional career

San Diego/Los Angeles Chargers
The San Diego Chargers selected Kaser in the sixth round (179th overall) of the 2016 NFL Draft.

On October 2, 2018, Kaser was waived by the Chargers after the team signed Donnie Jones.

Green Bay Packers
On November 3, 2018, Kaser was signed by the Green Bay Packers as an emergency option in case J. K. Scott needed to leave for the birth of his first child. The Packers then released Kaser on November 5 to make room on the roster for Ibraheim Campbell.

Oakland Raiders
On January 1, 2019, Kaser signed a reserve/future contract with the Oakland Raiders. He was released on May 6, 2019.

Green Bay Packers (second stint)
On November 21, 2020, Kaser was signed to the Green Bay Packers active roster, and was waived two days later.

San Francisco 49ers
On January 2, 2021, Kaser was signed to the San Francisco 49ers practice squad. He was released two days later.

References

External links
Los Angeles Chargers bio
Texas A&M Aggies bio

Living people
1993 births
American football punters
Green Bay Packers players
Los Angeles Chargers players
Oakland Raiders players
People from Strongsville, Ohio
Players of American football from Ohio
San Diego Chargers players
San Francisco 49ers players
Sportspeople from Cuyahoga County, Ohio
Texas A&M Aggies football players